Charlie Rowbottom (born 22 January 2003) is an Australian rules footballer playing for Gold Coast in the AFL Women's (AFLW).

Early life
Rowbottom grew up in Melbourne and first played Australian rules football in year eight at Loreto Mandeville Hall. She proceeded to play junior football for the East Malvern Knights of the South Metro Junior Football League, and shortly thereafter accepted a position in the Oakleigh Chargers girls teams. She is the younger sister of professional men's footballer James Rowbottom, who plays for the Sydney Swans.

Football career
Under the rules of the AFL Women's draft in 2021, Rowbottom was permitted to nominate the state of her choice for selection by an AFLW club. Despite growing up in Victoria, Rowbottom nominated Queensland, stating that although it would be "a shift in my life, it is all very exciting".  had the first overall pick in the draft, and so selected Rowbottom with the number one pick. She played her debut match in round one of the 2022 season against , and recorded 11 disposals. The following round she was nominated for the AFL Women's Rising Star award, in the Sun's 13-point win against . She missed out on winning the Rising Star award by one vote to Carlton's Mimi Hill, though she did win the equivalent award as judged by her peers at the Players Association MVP Awards.

References

External links
Gold Coast Suns profile

2003 births
Living people
Australian rules footballers from Melbourne
Gold Coast Football Club (AFLW) players
People educated at Loreto Mandeville Hall
Oakleigh Chargers players (NAB League Girls)